Vint is a masculine given name. Notable people with the name include:

 Vint Cerf (born 1943), American computer scientist
 Vint Harper, a fictional character

Masculine given names